Apata Memorial High School is a military-style private boarding school in Lagos, Nigeria. It was founded in 1980 by retired Nigerian Army Brigadier-General S. O. Apata (who was assassinated on January 8, 1995). The school has about 1550 pupils and 150 teachers. There are both boarding and day students. It is said to be the best school in Oshodi-Isolo local government and one of the best in lagos state.

Notable alumni
David Olumide Aderinokun, Nigerian politician
Modupe Ozolua, Nigerian entrepreneur
Niniola, Nigerian musician
Teni Apata, also known as Teni the entertainer and Teni Makanaki

References

Secondary schools in Lagos State
Educational institutions established in 1980
1980 establishments in Nigeria
Schools in Lagos